{{Album ratings
| rev1 = AllMusic
| rev1score = 
| rev2 = Encyclopedia of Popular Music
| rev2score = 
| rev3 = Entertainment Weekly
| rev3score = B+
| rev4 = The Great Rock Discography
| rev4score = 7/10
| rev5 = Q
| rev5score = 
| rev6 = Select
| rev6score = <ref name="Select">{{cite web |first=David |last=Cavanagh |title=Del Amitri: Change Everything" > Review |url=http://selectmagazinescans.monkeon.co.uk/showpage.php?file=wp-content/uploads/2013/05/albums11.jpg}}</ref>
}}Change Everything is the third studio album by Del Amitri, released on 1 June 1992 in the UK. It reached number 2 in the UK Albums Chart – the band's biggest hit LP – and was nominated by Q Magazine as one of the top 50 albums of 1992. It included the single "Always the Last to Know", which reached number 13 in the UK Singles Chart and entered the top 40 of the US Hot 100.

Track listing

 2014 expanded edition 
Disc 1 as per the original album''

Note
Tracks 16-18 recorded live at the Town & Country Club, London, 1993.

Personnel
Del Amitri
 Justin Currie – vocals, bass, guitar
 Iain Harvie – guitar
 David Cummings – guitar
 Andy Alston – keyboards
 Brian McDermott – drums
Additional musicians
 Nick Clark – bass on "When You Were Young", "I Won't Take the Blame" and "Sometimes I Just Have to Say Your Name"
Gary Barnacle – baritone and tenor saxophone on "Always the Last to Know" 
Technical
Gil Norton – producer
Steven Haigler – engineer
John McDonald – assistant engineer
Kenny Patterson – assistant engineer
Bob Ludwig – mastering (at Masterdisk, New York City)
Stylorouge – artwork 
Kevin Westenburg – photography 
Rob O'Conner – photography 
Steve Double – photography

Charts

References

External links
 Official Del Amitri homepage
 

Del Amitri albums
1992 albums
A&M Records albums
Albums produced by Gil Norton